The Act of Killing is a 2012 Danish-British-Norwegian documentary film directed by Joshua Oppenheimer, Christine Cynn, and an anonymous Indonesian co-director. The film explores the social significance of the Indonesian mass killings of 1965–1966 by focusing on the perpetrators and having them produce reenactments of the killings in the style of various Hollywood genres. The film's primary subjects had been petty criminals, but came to lead a powerful death squad during the anti-communist purge which resulted in the death of an estimated 500,000–2,000,000 suspected communists, communist sympathisers, alleged leftists, and ethnic Chinese. As many of the institutions and people responsible remained in power, those who carried out the killings were never held to account and continue to hold positions of power and respect. Oppenheimer was struck by the extent to which people not only rationalised but boasted about their participation in the killings, and used the film to explore the role the events continue to play in people's lives in the present. According to Oppenheimer, it is "about a regime in which genocide has, paradoxically, been effaced and celebrated – in order to keep the survivors terrified, the public brainwashed, and the perpetrators able to live with themselves."

The film first screened in September 2012 at the Telluride Film Festival in Colorado, and had its public premiere on July 19, 2013, in New York City. Its worldwide box office earnings totaled over $0.5 million USD, and it made $1.1 million in video sales. The Act of Killing has received worldwide critical acclaim. Rotten Tomatoes, a review aggregator, surveyed 137 reviews and judged 96% to be positive. Metacritic, another review aggregator, evaluated 30 reviews, finding an average score of 89 out of 100, indicating "universal acclaim".

The Act of Killing garnered awards and nominations primarily in the Best Documentary category and for Oppenheimer's direction, but also audience awards, special awards, and recognition for Signe Byrge Sørensen's production and editing by Janus Billeskov Jansen and Niels Pagh Andersen. Among its Best Documentary awards are a BAFTA, European Film Award, and a Robert Award, along with nominations for an Academy Award, Critics' Choice Movie Award, Directors Guild of America Award, Independent Spirit Award, and International Documentary Association Award. Included in many of the awards was the anonymous Indonesian co-director, who was unable to share in the recognition because of the danger posed by his or her participation.

The Act of Killing was screened only in underground venues in Indonesia, but its success led to media coverage there, generating controversy and opening a conversation about the past. In Oppenheimer's BAFTAs acceptance speech, he reported that the subject is receiving more attention, and that the film "is helping to catalyse a change in how Indonesia talks about its past". Oppenheimer also used the platform afforded by the awards to call attention to the "collective responsibility" of the United States and United Kingdom for "participating and ignoring" the crimes of 1965–66. When it was nominated for an Academy Award, the Indonesian government responded with a full-page statement about the killings and the film in the Jakarta Globe. The response marks the first time the government has admitted wrongdoing. The nomination also stoked controversy in China, where it had not been well known that Chinese people were the target of a significant amount of the violence.

Accolades

Notes

References

External links
 

Lists of accolades by film